The 2019–20 season was the Chittagong Abahani's 40th season since its establishment in 1980 and their 10th season in the Bangladesh Premier League. This also remarked their sixth consecutive season in the top flight after getting promoted in 2014. In this season, Chittagong Abahani participated in Bangladesh Federation Cup & Bangladesh Premier League.

On 16 March 2020, All sorts of sports activities in Bangladesh were postponed until March 31 as a precaution to combat the spread of coronavirus in the country, according to a press release issued by the Ministry of Youth and Sports.

Bangladesh Football Federation (BFF) postponed all Bangladesh Premier League matches until March 31.

On 17 May 2020, The BFF executive committee, following an emergency meeting, declared the 12th edition of the league abandoned, scrapping promotion and relegation while cancelling the Independence Cup from the calendar.

Summary

Pre-season
In October 2019, Chittagong Abahani organized and participated in 2019 Sheikh Kamal International Club Cup. Players including Bangladesh National Football Team captain Jamal Bhuyan, 2010 FIFA World Cup Quarterfinalist Prince Tagoe, Luka Rotkovic, Petar Planić were signed for the tournament. They also signed former National Team head coach Maruful Haque. Chittagong Abahani started the tournament with a 4–1 win against Maldivian side TC Sports Club. Abahani also beaten Young Elephants FC by 4–2 but lost with Mohun Bagan by 1–0. In semi-final, Abahani beaten Gokulam Kerala FC with an extra-time goal. However, Chittagong Abahani defeated by Terengganu FC in the Final and finished the tournament as runners-up. Luka, who scored three goals, was top scorer for Abahani in the tournament. The players who joined the team on loan and foreigners except Ikbol, Didier and Matthew were released after the tournament.

On November 20, Abahani signed a one-year contract with Maruful Haque. The signing made record as Maruful became highest paid local head coach of that season. Brazilian footballer Nixon Guylherme and Uzbek defender Shukurali Pulatov were signed to fill up foreign quota while Bangladesh international Nasirul Islam Nasir, Monjurur Rahman Manik, Rakib Hossain, Mohammad Rocky etc. were also signed to form a strong squad for upcoming season.

From December 4 to December 8, Chittagong Abahani took part in Mymensingh DFA Challenge Cup, a pre-season tournament, along with Saif Sporting Club and Bangladesh Police FC. The tournament was won by defeating Police FC in final with 1–0 margin.

December
In this month, the new football season started with 2019 Federation cup. Abahani played first match of the season against Brother Union on 22 December and won it by 2–0 with goals scored by Nixon and Matthew. Five days later, the last match of Group B against Bashundhara kings was won with 2–0 score. Rakib and Didier scored the goals. Abahani qualified for the knockout stage as group champion. Three days later, Abahani suffered a 2–0 defeat against Dhaka Mohammedan in quarter-final and were knocked out from 2019 Federation Cup.

January
The club started the new year with good news as two players from the team, Manik Hossain Mollah, Monjurur Rahman Manik and Rakib Hossain called up in 23-men squad of Bangladesh National Team for 2020 Bangabandhu Cup.  Rakib and Manik both made their international debut against Sri Lanka.

February
Ctg Abahani started 2019-20 BPL against Sheikh Jamal DC on 13 February. The away match was won with 2–0 as Didier and Matthew found the net. Five days later, the team suffered a 2–1 defeat against Arambagh KS in the first home game of the league. Shakhawat Rony scored the only goal in that match. On 23 February, Ctg Abahani played a 2–2 draw with Saif SC at Mymensingh conceding two late goals. Nixon & Matthew scored in that match. Mohammad Nayeem made his debut for the team in this match.

March
Ctg Abahani played their second home game of the league against Sheikh Russel KC on 2 March. The match was won by 2-0 Nixon & Mannaf Rabby scored. Five days later, Ctg Abahani defeated defending runners-up Dhaka Abahani by 2–0 on away schedule. Didier & Nasirul found the net on the game. On 15 March, they faced defending champion Bashundhara Kings at Nilphamari. Ctg Abahani made a historic comeback from 3–0 to 3-4 & won the match. Nixon netted a brace when Didier & Matthew each scored one goal. Mannaf Rabby provided two assists. On 16 March, remaining matches of month postponed till 31st march due to coronavirus outbreak.

Players
Chittagong Abahani Ltd. squad for 2019–20 season.

Pre-season and friendlies

Competitions

Federation Cup

Group B

Knockout stage

Premier League

League table

Results summary

Results by round

Matches

Statistics

Squad statistics

Goals

Goalkeeping Statistics

References

Sport in Chittagong
2019 in Bangladeshi football
2020 in Bangladeshi football